Bioresource Technology is a peer reviewed scientific journal published biweekly by Elsevier, covering the field of bioresource technology. The journal was established in 1979 as Agricultural Wastes and renamed to Biological Wastes in 1987, before obtaining its current title in 1991. It covers all areas concerning biomass, biological waste treatment, bioenergy, biotransformations and bioresource systems analysis, and technologies associated with conversion or production.

References

External links
 

Elsevier academic journals
Biweekly journals
English-language journals
Publications established in 1979
Biotechnology journals
Waste management journals